Keraniyo is an Ethiopian town in the district (woreda) of Hulet Ej Enese, part of Misraq Gojjam Zone, Amhara Region.

References

Populated places in Ethiopia